General Bernardo O'Higgins Airport  is an airport serving Chillán, a city in the Diguillín Province of Chile's Ñuble Region.

The airport is named for Bernardo O'Higgins, the first Chilean head of state.

See also

Transport in Chile
List of airports in Chile

References

External links
Airport record for Aeropuerto General Bernardo O'Higgins at Landings.com
FallingRain - General Bernardo O'Higgins Airport

Airports in Ñuble Region